Fort Hancock may refer to:

 Fort Hancock, Texas, a census-designated place in Hudspeth County
 Fort Hancock, New Jersey, former fort on Sandy Hook

See also
 Fort Hancock U.S. Life Saving Station, near Highlands, New Jersey